Ay Juancito is a 2004 Argentine biographical drama film directed by Héctor Olivera. It was written by Olivera and José Pablo Feinmann, and stars Adrián Navarro, Inés Estévez, and Leticia Brédice.

Synopsis 
The film is about the life of Juan Duarte, Eva Perón's brother and a political officer during Juan Domingo Perón's first presidency.

Exhibition 
The film opened wide in Argentina on June 10, 2004. It was later screened at a few film festivals, including the Cairo International Film Festival in Egypt and the Cannes Film Market in France.

Cast 
 Adrián Navarro as Juan Duarte 
 Inés Estévez as Alicia Dupont
 Leticia Brédice as Yvonne Pascal
 Norma Aleandro as Doña Juana
 Jorge Marrale as Juan Perón
 Norberto Arcusín as Actor in Niní Marshall's film
 Alejandro Awada as Héctor Cámpora
 Victoría Bargues as Herminia Duarte
 Silvina Boye as Secretaria Perón
 Marcelo Bucossi as Productor de Cine
 Carlos Cardone as Luis César Amadori
 Alfredo Cernadas as Traductor Inglés
 Oscar Cisterna as Ordenanza
 Hugo de Bruna as Abuelo Obra de Teatro
 Luis Ferreyra as Chofer de Juancito
 Celina Font as Julia Lobos
 Laura Novoa as Evita Perón

Awards 
Wins
 Cairo International Film Festival: Best Actor, Adrián Navarro; Best Director, Héctor Olivera; 2004.
 Clarin Entertainment Awards: Clarin Award Best New Film Actor, Adrián Navarro; 2004.
 Argentine Film Critics Association Awards: Silver Condor Best Costume Design, Horace Lannes; Best New Actor, Adrián Navarro; 2005.

References

External links 
 
 Ay Juancito at the cinenacional.com 

2004 films
Argentine biographical films
Argentine independent films
2000s Spanish-language films
Films directed by Héctor Olivera
Films shot in Buenos Aires
Films set in Buenos Aires
2000s Argentine films